The Magic Crane is a 1993 Hong Kong wuxia film produced by Tsui Hark, directed by Benny Chan and starring Tony Leung Chiu-wai, Anita Mui and Rosamund Kwan based on the novel Xian He Shen Zhen by Wolong Sheng.

Cast
Tony Leung Chiu-wai as Ma Kwan-mo
Anita Mui as Pak Wan-fai
Rosamund Kwan as Butterfly Lam
Damian Lau as Yat Yeung-chi
Lawrence Ng as So Pang-hoi
Norman Chui as Lam Hoi-ping
Zhang Tielin as General Cho Hung
Jay Lau as Lady Jade Flute
Vindy Chan as Chan Ngo
Lau Shun as crippled Reverend of Tai Kok Temple
Yu Ming-hin as clan member
Michael Lam as clan member
Yiu Man-kei as clan member

Theme songs
The Magic Crane (新仙鹤神针)
performed by Anita Mui and Jacky Cheung
produced by CY Kong
composed by Ng Tai-kong
lyrics by Lily Ho
Proudness (傲)
performed by Winnie Hsin
composed by James Wong
lyrics by Mark Lui

Box office
This film grossed HK$8,159,384 at the Hong Kong box office in its theatrical run from 19 August to 2 September 1993 in Hong Kong.

References

External links

The Magic Crane at Hong Kong Cinemagic

1993 films
1993 action films
1993 fantasy films
1993 martial arts films
Hong Kong action films
Hong Kong fantasy films
Hong Kong martial arts films
Wuxia films
Martial arts fantasy films
Kung fu films
1990s Cantonese-language films
Films based on Chinese novels
Films directed by Benny Chan
1990s Hong Kong films